Augusts Voss (30 October 1919, Saltykovo – 10 February 1994, Moscow) was a Soviet politician of Latvian origin and party functionary. Before World War II he worked as a school teacher. In 1940, he was mobilized into the Red Army and served as a politruk. From 1945, he served as a party apparatchik in Latvia. From 1966 till 1984, he was First Secretary (later: General Secretary) of the Communist Party of Latvia and member of the Central Committee of the Communist Party of the Soviet Union from 1971 till 1990. From 1984 till 1989, he was Chairman of the Soviet of Nationalities, upper chamber of the Supreme Soviet of the Soviet Union.

He did not return to Latvia and died in Moscow in 1994, where he is also buried.

See also
Arvīds Pelše
Alfrēds Rubiks

References

1919 births
1994 deaths
People from Tyumen Oblast
Heads of the Communist Party of Latvia
Central Committee of the Communist Party of the Soviet Union members
Members of the Supreme Soviet of the Latvian Soviet Socialist Republic, 1955–1959
Members of the Supreme Soviet of the Latvian Soviet Socialist Republic, 1959–1963
Members of the Supreme Soviet of the Latvian Soviet Socialist Republic, 1963–1967
Members of the Supreme Soviet of the Latvian Soviet Socialist Republic, 1967–1971
Members of the Supreme Soviet of the Latvian Soviet Socialist Republic, 1971–1975
Members of the Supreme Soviet of the Latvian Soviet Socialist Republic, 1975–1980
Chairmen of the Soviet of Nationalities
Seventh convocation members of the Soviet of Nationalities
Eighth convocation members of the Soviet of Nationalities
Ninth convocation members of the Soviet of Nationalities
Tenth convocation members of the Soviet of Nationalities
Eleventh convocation members of the Soviet of Nationalities
Soviet military personnel of World War II
Recipients of the Order of Lenin
Recipients of the Order of the Red Banner of Labour
Burials in Troyekurovskoye Cemetery